Tiffany Helm (born May 12, 1964) is an American film and television actress. Her best known role was in the 1985 horror film Friday the 13th: A New Beginning as Violet. She also starred in The Zoo Gang (1985) and Reform School Girls (1986) a B movie spoof of women in prison films.

She has also made guest appearances on TV shows such as Bare Essence, You Again?, 21 Jump Street, and Freddy's Nightmares.

She is the daughter of actress Brooke Bundy and actor Peter Helm. Tiffany studied dance with Roland Dupree and was a member of the Beverly Hills Mime Troupe.

In 2018, after a career break of more than 20 years, Helm returned to acting, appearing in films such as In the Tall Grass, Red Letter Day, 13 Fanboy, and Come True.

Filmography
Tiffany Helm became well known for making appearances on popular TV shows throughout the 1980s and 1990s

Likely Stories, Vol. 3 (1983) as Cissy
Hard to Hold (1984) as Fan #2
O.C. and Stiggs (1985) as Charlotte
Friday the 13th: A New Beginning (1985) as Violet
The Zoo Gang (1985) as Kate Haskell
Reform School Girls (1986) as Andrea 'Fish' Eldridge
Freddy's Nightmares (1989) (TV) as Waitress Mary
Sworn to Vengeance (1993) (TV)
Rama (1996) (VG) - Francesca Sabatini
In the Tall Grass (2019) as Gas Station Attendant
Red Letter Day (2019) as Nicole Morris
Come True (2020) as Old Woman
13 Fanboy (2021) as Tiffany Helm

External links
 

1964 births
American film actresses
American television actresses
American video game actresses
American voice actresses
Living people
Place of birth missing (living people)
21st-century American women